The 2019–20 season is Deportivo Morón's 3rd consecutive season in the second division of Argentine football, Primera B Nacional.

The season generally covers the period from 1 July 2019 to 30 June 2020.

Review

Pre-season
Deportivo Morón unveiled six new players on 10 June 2019. Dylan Glaby and Franco Ravizzoli came from Primera C Metropolitana duo Argentino and Deportivo Merlo, while Lucas Pérez Godoy and Diego Tonetto penned contract terms from Primera B Nacional's Mitre and Platense. Agustín Mansilla signed from Lanús, while Kevin Gissi joined from Italian club Cuneo. Matías Nizzo renewed his loan from Chacarita Juniors on 14 June. On 18 June, signing number seven was confirmed as Santamarina's Francisco Oliver put pen to paper. Matías Cortave was next through the door, as the full-back signed a deal from Brown on 27 June. Esteban Ciaccheri completed a move in on 29 June from Primera B de Chile side Rangers. 2018–19 loans expired on and around 30 June.

After suffering a loss to San Lorenzo in a pre-season friendly on 6 July, Morón won the secondary encounter later in the day thanks to a Damián Akerman goal. Sebastián Montero headed off to Justo José de Urquiza on 7 July. Morón played out two goalless friendly draws with Flandria on 10 July. Morón and Villa Dálmine met each other in friendlies on 13 July, subsequently playing out two draws. José D'Angelo secured terms from San Telmo on 15 July. A tie with Tigre on 20 July made it five straight draws in pre-season for Morón, though that streak was concluded with a victory over Tigre on the same day. Lucas Chacana arrived from Los Andes on 24 July. Due to inclement weather, on 26 July, Morón and Colegiales cancelled their friendly that was planned for the following day.

On 29 July, Gastón González went to Belgrano. Morón shared wins with Agropecuario on 2 August. On 7 August, Morón put six goals past Puerto Nuevo of Primera D Metropolitana - four of which were scored by Kevin Gissi. A friendly encounter with Sportivo Barracas was cancelled due to bad weather on 9 August, in order to protect the Estadio Nuevo Francisco Urbano pitch. 12 August saw Facundo Pumpido sign for Guillermo Brown.

August
Morón and Nueva Chicago neutralised each other on 19 August, as their opening fixture in Primera B Nacional ended without goals in Buenos Aires. Morón got their opening win of the season on 24 August, with Esteban Ciaccheri netting against Guillermo Brown. Matchday three saw Morón travel to face Alvarado in Mar del Plata, with el Gallito coming away with a 2–4 victory as Mauricio Alonso netted an all-important brace.

Squad

Transfers
Domestic transfer windows:3 July 2019 to 24 September 201920 January 2020 to 19 February 2020.

Transfers in

Transfers out

Friendlies

Pre-season
Deportivo Morón, on 20 June 2019, announced friendlies with San Lorenzo and Tigre. The latter being set for 20 July, with the former taking place on 6 July; the same day when they were also set to face Flandria in Jáuregui - as revealed by their opponents on 18 June - though that was later rescheduled, for Morón, for 10 July. Final details, including a kick-off time of 09:30, for the San Lorenzo encounter were told on 5 July. Villa Dálmine communicated a friendly with Morón was scheduled for 13 July. Colegiales would visit Morón on 27 July. On 29 July, Morón revealed three new pre-season opponents in Agropecuario, Puerto Nuevo and Sportivo Barracas.

Competitions

Primera B Nacional

Results summary

Matches
The fixtures for the 2019–20 league season were announced on 1 August 2019, with a new format of split zones being introduced. Deportivo Morón were drawn in Zone A.

Squad statistics

Appearances and goals

Statistics accurate as of 30 August 2019.

Goalscorers

Notes

References

Deportivo Morón seasons
Deportivo Morón